The Rubbish World of Dave Spud (shortened to Dave Spud)  is a  British children's animated series featuring the surreal adventures of the eponymous Dave Spud of Grimsby, his friends and tower block-dwelling family. It was created and directed by Edward Foster, inspired by his 2003 NFTS student short 'Anna Spud'. It was developed into a pilot in 2010 produced by The Illuminated Film Company. 26 11-minute instalments were commissioned, whilst the soundtrack was composed by electronic group Basement Jaxx. In May 2020, for series 2 a further 52 installments were commissioned. Series 3 is currently in production.

Production

The Rubbish World of Dave Spud was created by Edward Foster, who had previously worked as series director of Little Princess, and was adapted from his National Film and Television School student film Anna Spud (2003). Foster stated that the theme of the show was to "give the biggest adventure to the one who least expects it, to the one who isn’t holding up their hand or even looking. Giving it to them." 

The series is set in the Lincolnshire town of Grimsby, and although several of its landmarks are featured, such as the Spuds' tower block (modelled after the former high-rise on East Marsh) and the dock, Foster has stated the Grimsby featured in the show is intended to be purely fictional. A pilot was commissioned in 2010, and two years later was commissioned as a full series, but Foster decided to take a hiatus from the industry for a couple of years, which put production on hold until 2017.

Awards - winner of Royal Television Society Programme Award for Best Children's Programme 2022

Voice cast 
 Johnny Vegas as Dave Spud
 Lisa Hammond as Anna Spud
 Philip Glenister as Betty Spud (Mum)
 Arthur Smith as George Spud (Dad)
 Jane Horrocks as Gran Spud 
 Gina Yashere as Gareth
 Akiya Henry as Little Sue
 Adam Gillen as Robert Robot
 Additional voices: David Holt, Roger Griffiths, Dave Peacock, Edward Foster

Episodes

Season 1 (2019)

Season 2 (2020–2021)

Shorts

"Where Do All the Boats Go?" - a short commissioned for The Festival of the Sea at Heritage Square Alexandra Dock in Grimsby on July 16, 2022.

References

External links 
 
 

2019 British television series debuts
2010s British animated television series
2020s British animated television series
2010s British children's television series
2020s British children's television series
British children's animated adventure television series
British children's animated comedy television series
British children's animated fantasy television series
British flash animated television series
ITV children's television shows
Television shows set in Lincolnshire